Don't Ask Me Why may refer to:

 "Don't Ask Me Why" (Elvis Presley song), 1958
 "Don't Ask Me Why" (Billy Joel song), 1980
 "Don't Ask Me Why" (Eurythmics song), 1989